Diane Loeffler (July 12, 1953 – November 16, 2019) was a Minnesota politician and member of the Minnesota House of Representatives. A member of the Minnesota Democratic–Farmer–Labor Party (DFL), she represented District 60A, which includes the thirteen neighborhoods of Northeast Minneapolis, which is part of the Twin Cities metropolitan area. She was also a health policy analyst and planner for Hennepin County.

Education and professional career
Loeffler graduated from Edison High School in Minneapolis, then went on to Augsburg College, also in Minneapolis, earning her Bachelor of Arts magna cum laude in Social Science. She also attended graduate school at the University of Minnesota for Educational Administration and Public Administration. Prior to her position with Hennepin County, she worked as a senior financial analyst for the city of Minneapolis, with Hennepin County Human Services' Health and Training and Employment, as a tax policy analyst and legislative representative for the League of Minnesota Cities, as Director of Senior Services for School District 281, and as an education budget and policy analyst for the state of Minnesota.

Minnesota House of Representatives
Loeffler was first elected in 2004 and was re-elected every two years until her death in 2019.

Community service
Active in her local community and at the state level through the years, Loeffler was the executive director of the Association for Retarded Citizens of Saint Paul, a founding board member of the Minnesota Council of Nonprofits, a founder of Northeast Libraries Supporters, and a member of the Windom Park Citizens in Action. She was also a member of the Central Avenue Planning Committee, of the Minneapolis Citizens Committee on Public Education, and of the Northeast Retail Shopping Task Force. She served on the Minnesota 2005 Capitol Centennial Commission, and on the Minnesota Statehood Sesquicentennial Commission from 2006 to 2008.

Death
Loeffler died on November 16, 2019, from cancer. She was 66 years old.

References

External links

 Rep. Loeffler Web Page
 Minnesota Public Radio Votetracker: Rep. Diane Loeffler
 Project Votesmart - Rep. Diane Loeffler Profile
 Diane Loeffler Campaign Web Site 

1953 births
2019 deaths
21st-century American politicians
21st-century American women politicians
Augsburg University alumni
Deaths from cancer in Minnesota
Politicians from Minneapolis
Democratic Party members of the Minnesota House of Representatives
University of Minnesota alumni
Women state legislators in Minnesota
Edison High School (Minnesota) alumni